Morrow Island is a small island located off the shore of Grizzly Bay (part of Suisun Bay) in the San Francisco Bay Area of California. It is part of Solano County, California, and partially administered by Reclamation District 2138. It has an elevation of 2 meters to 7 feet.

References

Islands of the San Francisco Bay Area
Islands of Northern California
Islands of Solano County, California
Islands of Suisun Bay